The Gravel Point Formation is a geologic formation in western Michigan. It preserves fossils dating back to the middle Devonian period and correlates with the Long Lake Limestone and Alpena Limestone.

Description
The Michigan Basin was a shallow marine shelf during the middle Devonian, located between 30º South and 20º North latitude in central Laurasia. According to stratigraphic and paleontological examination, the sediments of the Gravel Point Formation were deposited in a shallow lagoonal reef environment.

Fossil content

Vertebrates

Acanthodians

Bony fish

Placoderms

Invertebrates
Several species of ostracods, an unidentified arthropod 'hook', crinoid columnals and several species of polychaetes and scolecodonts are known from the formation.

Brachiopods

Bryozoans

Cnidarians

Sponges

Tentaculitans

Trilobites

Flora
Algal colonies are known from the formation.

Acritarchs

Plants

See also

 List of fossiliferous stratigraphic units in Michigan

References

 

Devonian Michigan
Devonian southern paleotemperate deposits